The 2006–07 Nemzeti Bajnokság I, also known as NB I, was the 105th season of top-tier football in Hungary. The league was officially named Borsodi Liga for sponsoring reasons. The season started on 28 July 2006 and ended on 28 May 2007.

League standings

Results

Statistical leaders

Top goalscorers

External links
 Official website 
 Hungary - List of final tables (RSSSF)

Nemzeti Bajnokság I seasons
1
Hungary